James Knox (1914–1983) was the Catholic archbishop of Melbourne, 1967–74.

James or Jim Knox may also refer to:

James Hall Mason Knox (1824–1903), Presbyterian, educator, president of Lafayette College
James Knox (cyclist) (born 1995), British cyclist
James Knox (Illinois politician) (1807–1876), U.S. Representative from Illinois
James Knox (Montana politician) (born 1965), Republican member of the Montana Legislature and politician
James Knox (British politician), member of parliament for Dungannon
James Meldrum Knox (1878–1918), British Army officer
James Knox, lead singer of The Waltones
Jim Knox (1919–1991), New Zealand trade unionist and politician
Jim Knox (American football), Fox Sports American football commentator, see 2000 Oklahoma Sooners football team
Jim Knox (ice hockey), Canadian ice hockey goaltender, 1966 Memorial Cup champion, brother of Swede Knox